Vulturești is a commune in Vaslui County, Western Moldavia, Romania. It is composed of four villages: Buhăiești, Podeni, Voinești and Vulturești.

References

Communes in Vaslui County
Localities in Western Moldavia